Season 1981–82 was the 98th football season in which Dumbarton competed at a Scottish national level, entering the Scottish Football League for the 76th time, the Scottish Cup for the 87th time and the Scottish League Cup for the 35th time.

Overview 
For the seventh year in a row, Dumbarton played league football in Division 1, and with another new manager in place - Billy Lamont - hopes were high to see if promotion could finally be won.  Unfortunately, despite a few excellent results, including wins over Hearts, the campaign was a disappointment, and although relegation was never a real threat, an 11th place finish with 35 points was all that was achieved, 26 behind champions Motherwell.

In the Scottish Cup, Dumbarton again began well by beating Premier Division opponents, this time Partick Thistle, in the third round but lost out to a powerful Rangers side in the next round.

The League Cup was a bit of a disaster.  The format reverted to sectional games for qualification to the latter stages, and Dumbarton could only manage two home wins from six games, from what was 'on paper' an easy section.

Locally, in the Stirlingshire Cup, Dumbarton almost retained the cup , but lost out on penalties to Alloa in the final.

Results & fixtures

Scottish First Division

Scottish League Cup

Scottish Cup

Stirlingshire Cup

Pre-season matches

League table

Player statistics

Squad 

|}

International Caps
Graeme Sinclair played for Scotland in a 'semi-pro' international tournament involving teams from England, Holland and Italy. Scotland won the tournament by beating Holland Amateurs 2-1, drawing 2-2 against Italy Serie C and drawing 1-1 against England semi pro.

Transfers
Amongst those players joining and leaving the club were the following:

Players in

Players out

Trivia
  The League match against Hearts on 26 September marked Tommy Coyle's 100th appearance for Dumbarton in all national competitions - the 85th Dumbarton player to reach this milestone.

See also
 1981–82 in Scottish football

References

External links
Alistair Edmiston (Dumbarton Football Club Historical Archive)
Steve Armstrong (Dumbarton Football Club Historical Archive)
John Cameron (Dumbarton Football Club Historical Archive)
D McGeoch (Dumbarton Football Club Historical Archive)
Ian Wotherspoon (Dumbarton Football Club Historical Archive)
Scottish Football Historical Archive

Dumbarton F.C. seasons
Scottish football clubs 1981–82 season